Innwa Bank Limited is a private commercial bank in Burma (Myanmar). Innwa Bank was founded by the Myanmar Economic Corporation (MEC) in 1997, a major conglomerate owned by serving and retired military officers of the Tatmadaw, affiliated with the Myanmar Ministry of Defence. The bank serves as a financial vehicle for MEC's subsidiaries and affiliates. Innwa Bank is wholly owned by MEC, which is in turn, owned by the government. Military authorities control the bank's management.

References

Banks of Myanmar
Banks established in 1997
1997 establishments in Myanmar
Entities related to Myanmar sanctions